Al Hamed is a town in Egypt near Rosetta. On 21 April 1807, forces loyal to Muhammad Ali defeated a small British force here during the Alexandria expedition of 1807.

Notes

References
 Hassan, Hassan & Fernea, Robert, In the House of Muhammad Ali: A Family Album, 1805-1952, American University in Cairo Press, 2000

Populated places in Egypt